Panj Free Economic Zone is a free economic zone in Khatlon Province in Tajikistan.

External links 
 Web Site, https://web.archive.org/web/20110816034506/http://fezpanj.tj/index_eng.htm
 Regulation of Free Economic Zone "Panj", https://web.archive.org/web/20120314181233/http://www.tajinvest.tj/downloads/FEZ%20Panj.pdf

 Economy of Tajikistan
 Special economic zones